The mamore arboreal rice rat, (Oecomys mamorae), also known as the Mamore oecomys is an arboreal species of rodent in the genus Oecomys of family Cricetidae. Its distribution extends over much of Bolivia and into nearby Brazil and Paraguay. Although Oecomys has been recorded from Argentina, it is uncertain whether those records represent O. mamorae. It is found in a variety of habitats at elevations from 200 to 2100 m, where it feeds on fruit and green seeds.

References

Literature cited
Carleton,  M.D., Emmons, L.H. and Musser, G.G. 2009. A new species of the rodent genus Oecomys (Cricetidae: Sigmodontinae:  Oryzomyini) from eastern Bolivia, with emended definitions of O. concolor (Wagner) and O. mamorae (Thomas). American Museum Novitates 3661:1–32.
Dunnum, J., Vargas, J., Bernal, N., Pardinas, U., Patterson, B. and Teta, P. 2008. . In IUCN. IUCN Red List of Threatened Species. Version 2009.2. <www.iucnredlist.org>. Downloaded on November 30, 2009.
Musser, G.G. and Carleton, M.D. 2005. Superfamily Muroidea. Pp. 894–1531 in Wilson, D.E. and Reeder, D.M. (eds.). Mammal Species of the World: a taxonomic and geographic reference. 3rd ed. Baltimore: The Johns Hopkins University Press, 2 vols., 2142 pp. 

Oecomys
Mammals described in 1906
Taxa named by Oldfield Thomas